Odontopodisma is a genus of grasshoppers in the subfamily Melanoplinae, tribe Podismini, found in Europe and western Asia.

Species
Species include:
Odontopodisma acuminata
Odontopodisma albanica
Odontopodisma carpathica
Odontopodisma decipiens
 Odontopodisma fallax (synonym Odontopodisma rammei)
 Odontopodisma montana
 Odontopodisma rubripes
 Odontopodisma schmidtii (type species)

References

External links

Acrididae genera
Melanoplinae
Orthoptera of Europe
Taxonomy articles created by Polbot